Rainer Matthias Holm-Hadulla (born September 22, 1951) is a German professor of psychiatry, psychosomatic medicine, psychotherapy and psychoanalysis.

Life
Holm-Hadulla studied medicine and philosophy at the Universities of Marburg, Rome, and Heidelberg. During the period from 1976 until 1978, he worked as an assistant doctor. Since 1979 until 1986, he became a specialist in psychiatry, psychosomatic medicine and psychotherapy and an assistant professor at Heidelberg University.

From 1986 until 2016, he was the director of the counseling service for students at Heidelberg University and worked as a psychiatrist, psychotherapist and psychoanalyst in private practice. In 1996, he became an associate professor for psychotherapy and psychotherapeutic medicine at Heidelberg University. In 2009, Holm-Hadulla was appointed as a distinguished fellow to "Morphomata", International Center of Excellence for Advanced Studies at Cologne University. In 2010, he was appointed as a distinguished fellow to "Marsilius-Kolleg", Center of Excellence for Advanced Interdisciplinary Studies at Heidelberg University. In 2011, he became a visiting professor at the Universidad Diego Portales, Santiago de Chile. In 2015, he was appointed to the Academia Argentina de Ciencias, Psychoanálisis y Psiqiuatría. Moreover, Holm-Hadulla frequently gave scientific lectures in North-America, South-America and China.

Since 2017, Holm-Hadulla is the director of the Heidelberg Institute for Coaching. He continues to teach at Heidelberg University and works as a supervisor and a training-analyst. He is a member of the International Psychoanalytic Association (IPA). He also teaches as a visiting professor at national and international universities, e.g. the Pop-Academy Baden-Württemberg, Mannheim. His main areas of research are counseling, psychotherapy and creativity. He continuously informes about practical applications of his research in broadcast and radio stations, newspapers and journals.

Dialectical theory of creativity

Holm-Hadulla developed with his colleagues a dialectical theory of creativity. It starts with the antique concept, that creativity takes place in an interplay between order and chaos. Similar ideas can be found in neurosciences and psychology. Neurobiologically, it can be shown that the creative process takes place in a dynamic interplay between coherence and incoherence that leads to new and usable neuronal networks. Psychology shows how the dialectics of convergent and focused thinking with divergent and associative thinking leads to new ideas and products. Also creative personality traits seem to be contradictory, e.g. openness and selfishness, chaotic and disciplined attitudes, despondency and exuberance. Holm-Hadulla described the dialectics of creative personality traits on behalf of extraordinary personalities like Johann Wolfgang von Goethe, Robert Schumann, Jim Morrison, Madonna Ciccone and Mick Jagger. His dialectical theory of creativity applies also to counseling and psychotherapy.

Works

Books
 Psicoterapia Integrativa - Un modello interdisciplinare attraverso tredici racconti di pratica psycoterapeutica. Mimesis Edizioni, Milano 2022, .
 Integrative Psychotherapie. 2. ed., Psychosozial-Verlag, Gießen 2021, .
 Goethe's Path to Creativity: A Psycho-Biography of the Eminent Politician, Scientist and Poet. Routledge, Taylor & Francis Group 2019, .
 The Recovered Voice - Tales of Practical Psychotherapy. Karnac Books, London/New York 2017, .
 Passione. Il cammino di Goethe verso la creatività. Una psicobiografia. Traduzione dal tedesco e cura di Antonio Staude, edizione rielaborata e accresciuta rispetto all’opera originale. Mimesis Edizioni, Milano 2016, .
 Kreativität zwischen Schöpfung und Zerstörung. Konzepte aus Kulturwissenschaften, Psychologie, Neurobiologie und ihre praktischen Anwendungen. Vandenhoeck & Ruprecht, Göttingen 2011, .
 Kreativität. Konzept und Lebensstil. Vandenhoeck & Ruprecht, Göttingen 2010, .
 Leidenschaft: Goethes Weg zur Kreativität. Eine Psychobiographie. Vandenhoeck & Ruprecht, Göttingen 2009, .
 The Art of Counseling and Psychotherapy. Revised and expanded English edition. Karnac Books, London/New York 2004, .
 El Arte Psicoterapéutico - la hermenéutica como base de la acción terapéutica. Revised and expanded Spanish edition. Editorial Herder, Barcelona 1997, .

Editor
 with Joachim Funke, Michael Wink: Intelligence - Theories and Applications, Springer Nature, London, Berlin, New York 2022, .

Selected papers
The following papers are available from MedLine, PsycInfo and Research Gate:
 Holm-Hadulla, R. M. (2020). "Creativity and Positive Psychology in Psychotherapy." International Journal of Psychiatry, doi.org/10.1080/09540261
 Holm-Hadulla, R. M. (2019). "Sympathy for the Devil - The Creative Transformation of the Evil". Journal of Genius and Eminence, 5(1):1–11.
 Holm-Hadulla, R. M., Koutsoukou-Argyraki, A. (2017)."Bipolar Disorder and/or Creative Bipolarity: Robert Schumann's Exemplary Psychopathology". Psychopathology, 50(6):379-388.
 Holm-Hadulla, R. M., Koutsoukou-Argyraki, A. (2016)."Integrative Psychotherapy of Patients with Schizophrenic Spectrum Disorders: The Case of a Musician Suffering From Psychotic Episodes". Journal of Psychotherapy Integration, 26(4):425-436.
 Holm-Hadulla, R. M., Koutsoukou-Argyraki, A. (2015). "Mental Health of Students in a Globalized World". Mental Health and Prevention, 3, 1–4.
 Holm-Hadulla, R. M., Bertolino, A. (2014). "Creativity, Alcohol and Drug Abuse: The Pop Icon Jim Morrison". Psychopathology, 47(3):167–173.
 Holm-Hadulla, R. M. (2013). "The Dialectic of Creativity: A Synthesis of Neurobiological, Psychological, Cultural and Practical Aspects of the Creative Process". Creativity Research Journal, 25(3), 293–299. 
 Holm-Hadulla, R. M. (2012). "Goethe's Anxieties, Depressive Episodes and (Self-) Therapeutic Strategies: A Contribution to Method Integration in Psychotherapy". Psychopathology, 46:266–274.
 Holm-Hadulla, R. M. & Hofmann, F. (2012). "Counselling, psychotherapy and creativity". Asia Pacific Journal of Counselling And Psychotherapy, 3, 130–136.
 Holm-Hadulla, R. M. (2011). "Creatividad, Depresión y Psicoanálisis: el caso Goethe". Revista Argentina de Psicoanálisis, 58, 695–714.
 Holm-Hadulla R. M., Sperth M., & Hofmann F. (2011). "Integrative Counselling". Asian-Pacific Journal of Counselling and Psychotherapy, 2, 3–24.
 Holm-Hadulla, R. M., Roussel, M., & Hofmann, F. (2010). "Depression and creativity: The case of the German poet, scientist and statesman J. W. v. Goethe". Journal of Affective Disorders, 127 (1–3), 43–49.
 Holm-Hadulla, R. M. (2005). "Aesthetic and hermeneutic judgements in psychotherapy". Philosophy, Psychiatry, & Psychology, 12, 297–299.
 Holm-Hadulla, R. M. (2003). "Psychoanalysis as a creative shaping process". The International Journal of Psychoanalysis, 84, 1203–1220.

References

External links
 Website of Rainer M. Holm-Hadulla 
 Academia.edu page
 University of Cologne biography
 Routledge biography
 University of Heidelberg biography 

1951 births
German psychoanalysts
Living people